The 1948 All-Big Seven Conference football team consists of American football players chosen by various organizations for All-Big Six Conference teams for the 1948 college football season.  The selectors for the 1948 season included the Associated Press (AP).

All-Big Seven selections

Backs
 Jack Mitchell, Oklahoma (AP-1)
 Harold Entsminger, Missouri (AP-1)
 George Thomas, Oklahoma (AP-1)
 Richard Gilman, Kansas (AP-1)

Ends
 Mel Sheehan, Missouri (AP-1)
 Jim Owens, Oklahoma (AP-1)

Tackles
 Homer Paine, Oklahoma (AP-1)
 Chester Fritz, Missouri (AP-1)

Guards
 Paul Burris, Oklahoma (AP-1)
 Dick Tomlinson, Kansas (AP-1)

Centers
 Robert Fuchs, Missouri (AP-1)

Key
AP = Associated Press

See also
1948 College Football All-America Team

References

All-Big Six Conference football team
All-Big Eight Conference football teams